Calochortus apiculatus is a North American species of flowering plants in the lily family.

Distribution
Calochortus apiculatus is native to western Canada (Alberta and British Columbia) and the northwestern United States. Most of the US specimens are from the northern Rocky Mountains of Idaho, Montana, and Washington, but there are reports of isolated populations in the Black Hills of Crook County, Wyoming.

Description
Calochortus apiculatus is a bulb-forming perennial herb producing a single stalk up to 30 cm tall. Flowers are pale yellow with purple streaks and yellow hairs on the petals.

References

External links
 
 Flora of Eastern Washington and Adjacent Idaho, Eastern Washington University, Calochortus apiculatus Baker - includes color photos
 Pacific Bulb Society, Calochortus Species One - includes color photos of several species including Calochortus apiculatus
 Mariposa Lilies East of the Cascade Mts.,  Paul Slichter, The Genus Calochortus - includes color photos

apiculatus
Flora of North America
Plants described in 1875